Gearhead Records is an independent record label based in Northern California which grew out of Gearhead magazine.

Magazine and festivals
The organization, originally a magazine, has also hosted festivals. Wrote Exclaim! in 2003:

Artists

See also

 List of record labels

References

External links 

 Gearhead Records
 In Music We Trust Interview with Mike LaVella

Record labels established in 2000
American independent record labels
Punk record labels
Garage rock record labels
Rock record labels
Alternative rock record labels
2000 establishments in California